In mathematics, specifically in topology and functional analysis, a subspace  of a uniform space  is said to be sequentially complete or semi-complete if every Cauchy sequence in  converges to an element in . 
 is called sequentially complete if it is a sequentially complete subset of itself.

Sequentially complete topological vector spaces 

Every topological vector space is a uniform space so the notion of sequential completeness can be applied to them.

Properties of sequentially complete topological vector spaces 

A bounded sequentially complete disk in a Hausdorff topological vector space is a Banach disk.
A Hausdorff locally convex space that is sequentially complete and bornological is ultrabornological.

Examples and sufficient conditions 

Every complete space is sequentially complete but not conversely.
A metrizable space then it is complete if and only if it is sequentially complete.
Every complete topological vector space is quasi-complete and every quasi-complete topological vector space is sequentially complete.

See also 

 Cauchy net
 Complete space
 Complete topological vector space
 Quasi-complete space
 Topological vector space
 Uniform space

References

Bibliography
   
  
  
  
  

Functional analysis
Topological vector spaces